South Okanagan was a provincial electoral district in the Canadian province of British Columbia beginning with the election of 1916.  Following the 1975 election boundary revisions accompanied the riding's renaming to Okanagan South.  The riding was originally part of the Yale riding until 1890, and when first that riding was broken up the Okanagan was in Yale-East (1894–1900), and then in Okanagan (1903–1912).  Both South Okanagan and North Okanagan were created in advance of the 1916 election.

Notable MLAs
The most famous MLA from this riding was indubitably W.A.C. Bennett, who won the seat originally as a Conservative in 1941, sat with the Coalition in '45 and '49, then joined the Social Credit League of British Columbia in the preferential-ballot melee of '52 and '53 which led to his securing majority rule for his long tenure as Premier from 1953 to 1972.  The second-most famous MLA from this riding was his son, William Richards Bennett, Premier from 1975 election to 1986 election.

Political geography

Election results 

|-

|Liberal
|Leslie Vivian Rogers
|align="right"|705 	
|align="right"|45.48%
|align="right"|
|align="right"|unknown
|- bgcolor="white"
!align="right" colspan=3|Total valid votes
!align="right"|1,550 	 
!align="right"|100.00%
!align="right"|
|- bgcolor="white"
!align="right" colspan=3|Total rejected ballots
!align="right"|
!align="right"|
!align="right"|
|- bgcolor="white"
!align="right" colspan=3|Turnout
!align="right"|%
!align="right"|
!align="right"|
|}
 

|-

|Liberal
|Leslie Vivian Rogers
|align="right"|1,433 		 	
|align="right"|43.23%
|align="right"|
|align="right"|unknown
|- bgcolor="white"
!align="right" colspan=3|Total valid votes
!align="right"|3,315  
!align="right"|100.00%
!align="right"|
|- bgcolor="white"
!align="right" colspan=3|Total rejected ballots
!align="right"|
!align="right"|
!align="right"|
|- bgcolor="white"
!align="right" colspan=3|Turnout
!align="right"|%
!align="right"|
!align="right"|
|- bgcolor="white"
!align="right" colspan=7|1  Endorsed by FLP but ran on SPC platform.
|}
	

|-

|Liberal
|Charles Barrell Latta
|align="right"|1,318 			
|align="right"|34.76%
|align="right"|
|align="right"|unknown

|Canadian Labour Party
|John William Stalker Logie
|align="right"|125 		
|align="right"|3.30%
|align="right"|
|align="right"|unknown
|- bgcolor="white"
!align="right" colspan=3|Total valid votes
!align="right"|3,792
!align="right"|100.00%
!align="right"|
|- bgcolor="white"
!align="right" colspan=3|Total rejected ballots
!align="right"|
!align="right"|
!align="right"|
|- bgcolor="white"
!align="right" colspan=3|Turnout
!align="right"|%
!align="right"|
!align="right"|
|}	  	  	  	  	  	 
  	  	  	  	 

|-

|Independent
|Daniel Wilbur Sutherland
|align="right"|1,680 	 	
|align="right"|43.92%
|align="right"|
|align="right"|unknown
|- bgcolor="white"
!align="right" colspan=3|Total valid votes
!align="right"|3,825 
!align="right"|100.00%
!align="right"|
|- bgcolor="white"
!align="right" colspan=3|Total rejected ballots
!align="right"|21
!align="right"|
!align="right"|
|- bgcolor="white"
!align="right" colspan=3|Turnout
!align="right"|%
!align="right"|
!align="right"|
|}
 	  	  	  	 

|-

|Liberal
|Joseph Allen Harris
|align="right"|1,636 	
|align="right"|36.66%

|Co-operative Commonwealth Fed.
|Owen Lewis Jones
|align="right"|1,382 	
|align="right"|30.97%
|- bgcolor="white"
!align="right" colspan=3|Total valid votes
!align="right"|4,463 
!align="right"|100.00%
!align="right"|
|- bgcolor="white"
!align="right" colspan=3|Total rejected ballots
!align="right"|0
|- bgcolor="white"
!align="right" colspan=7|1  Endorsed by the Independent CCF.
|} 	  	  	  	 
	  	  	  	  	 

|-

|Liberal
|Cecil Robert Bull 
|align="right"|2,388 	
|align="right"|45.02%
|align="right"|
|align="right"|unknown

|Co-operative Commonwealth Fed.
|Silvanus Noble Dixon
|align="right"|815 	 	
|align="right"|15.37%
|align="right"|
|align="right"|unknown
|- bgcolor="white"
!align="right" colspan=3|Total valid votes
!align="right"|5,304 
!align="right"|100.00%
!align="right"|
|- bgcolor="white"
!align="right" colspan=3|Total rejected ballots
!align="right"|57
!align="right"|
!align="right"|
|- bgcolor="white"
!align="right" colspan=3|Turnout
!align="right"|%
!align="right"|
!align="right"|
|}
  	  	  	  	  

|-

|Liberal
|Cecil Robert Bull
|align="right"|1,769 	 	
|align="right"|33.19%
|align="right"|
|align="right"|unknown

|Co-operative Commonwealth Fed.
|Felicia Snowsell
|align="right"|1,552 		
|align="right"|29.12%
|align="right"|
|align="right"|unknown
|- bgcolor="white"
!align="right" colspan=3|Total valid votes
!align="right"|5,330
!align="right"|100.00%
!align="right"|
|- bgcolor="white"
!align="right" colspan=3|Total rejected ballots
!align="right"|53
!align="right"|
!align="right"|
|- bgcolor="white"
!align="right" colspan=3|Turnout
!align="right"|%
!align="right"|
!align="right"|
|- bgcolor="white"
!align="right" colspan=7|2  Electoral debut.  Later 25th Premier of British Columbia, 1952–1972, and father of 27th Premier, William Richards Bennett (both Social Credit.
|}
 	  	  	 

|-

|Co-operative Commonwealth Fed.
|Gladys Adelia Webster
|align="right"|2,062 		
|align="right"|35.75%
|align="right"|
|align="right"|unknown
|- bgcolor="white"
!align="right" colspan=3|Total valid votes
!align="right"|5,768 
!align="right"|100.00%
!align="right"|
|- bgcolor="white"
!align="right" colspan=3|Total rejected ballots
!align="right"|140
!align="right"|
!align="right"|
|- bgcolor="white"
!align="right" colspan=3|Turnout
!align="right"|%
!align="right"|
!align="right"|
|}
  	  	  	  	 	  	  	   	 

|-

|Co-operative Commonwealth Fed.
|Thomas Wilkinson
|align="right"|4,669 	 		
|align="right"|41.60%
|align="right"|
|align="right"|unknown
|- bgcolor="white"
!align="right" colspan=3|Total valid votes
!align="right"|11,224 
!align="right"|100.00%
!align="right"|
|- bgcolor="white"
!align="right" colspan=3|Total rejected ballots
!align="right"|171
!align="right"|
!align="right"|
|- bgcolor="white"
!align="right" colspan=3|Turnout
!align="right"|%
!align="right"|
!align="right"|
|}

|Co-operative Commonwealth Fed.
|Thomas Wilkinson
|align="right"|2,654                     
|align="right"|22.36% 
|align="right"|2,654  
|align="right"|22.36%
|align="right"|
|align="right"|unknown

|Liberal
|Cecil Robert Bull
|align="right"|1,763           
|align="right"|14.85%
|align="right"|1,763 	 	
|align="right"|14.85%
|align="right"|
|align="right"|unknown

|Progressive Conservative
|William Bower Hughes-Games
|align="right"|1,371            
|align="right"|11.55%
|align="right"|1,371
|align="right"|11.55%
|align="right"|
|align="right"|unknown
|- bgcolor="white"
!align="right" colspan=3|Total valid votes
!align="right"|11,870     
!align="right"|100.00%
!align="right"|11,870 
!align="right"|%
!align="right"|
|- bgcolor="white"
!align="right" colspan=3|Total rejected ballots
!align="right"|543
!align="right"|
!align="right"|
|- bgcolor="white"
!align="right" colspan=3|Turnout
!align="right"|%
!align="right"|
!align="right"|
|- bgcolor="white"
!align="right" colspan=9|3 Preferential ballot; final count is between top two candidates from first count; one count only needed in this riding.
|}	  	 	 
  	  	  	  	  	  	 	  	  	 

|Co-operative Commonwealth Fed.
|Thomas Wilkinson  	 	 	
|align="right"|2,427 	 		 	       
|align="right"|21.02% 
|align="right"|2,427   
|align="right"|21.02%
|align="right"|
|align="right"|unknown

|Liberal
|John Victor Hyde Wilson 
|align="right"|1,961 	 	 				 	 	     
|align="right"|16.98% 
|align="right"|1,961 
|align="right"|16.98 % 
|align="right"|
|align="right"|unknown

|Progressive Conservative
|Katharine Frances Huntington Weddell
|align="right"|403 		 	                     
|align="right"|3.49% 
|align="right"|403  
|align="right"|3.49%
|align="right"|
|align="right"|unknown
|- bgcolor="white"
!align="right" colspan=3|Total valid votes
!align="right"|11,547 	  		   	  	       
!align="right"|100.00%
!align="right"|11,547   
!align="right"|%
!align="right"|
|- bgcolor="white"
!align="right" colspan=3|Total rejected ballots
!align="right"|477
!align="right"|
!align="right"|
!align="right"|
!align="right"|
|- bgcolor="white"
!align="right" colspan=3|Total Registered Voters
!align="right"|
!align="right"|
!align="right"|
!align="right"|
!align="right"|
|- bgcolor="white"
!align="right" colspan=3|Turnout
!align="right"|%
!align="right"|
!align="right"|
!align="right"|
!align="right"|
|- bgcolor="white"
!align="right" colspan=9|4  Preferential ballot; final count is between top two candidates from first count; one count only needed in this riding.
|}
  	  	  	  	 

|-

|Co-operative Commonwealth Fed.
|Walter Ratzlaff
|align="right"|1,663 	
|align="right"|15.07%
|align="right"|
|align="right"|unknown

|Liberal
|Cecil Robert Bull
|align="right"|1,230 	          
|align="right"|11.14%
|align="right"|
|align="right"|unknown

|Progressive Conservative]
|Brian Coryell Weddell
|align="right"|451 		
|align="right"|4.09%
|align="right"|
|align="right"|unknown
|- bgcolor="white"
!align="right" colspan=3|Total valid votes
!align="right"|11,038  
!align="right"|100.00%
!align="right"|
|- bgcolor="white"
!align="right" colspan=3|Total rejected ballots
!align="right"|186
!align="right"|
!align="right"|
|- bgcolor="white"
!align="right" colspan=3|Turnout
!align="right"|%
!align="right"|
!align="right"|
|}
  	  	  	  	   	 

|-

|Co-operative Commonwealth Fed.
|Walter Ratzlaff
|align="right"|2,902 		
|align="right"|21.57%
|align="right"|
|align="right"|unknown

|Progressive Conservative
|Hubert Stuart Harrison Smith
|align="right"|1,256 	
|align="right"|9.34%
|align="right"|
|align="right"|unknown

|Liberal
|Joseph M. Barre
|align="right"|1,238 			
|align="right"|9.20%
|align="right"|
|align="right"|unknown
|- bgcolor="white"
!align="right" colspan=3|Total valid votes
!align="right"|13,454 
!align="right"|100.00%
!align="right"|
|- bgcolor="white"
!align="right" colspan=3|Total rejected ballots
!align="right"|301
!align="right"|
!align="right"|
|- bgcolor="white"
!align="right" colspan=3|Turnout
!align="right"|%
!align="right"|
!align="right"|
|}
	  	  	  	  	  	  	  	 

|-

|Progressive Conservative
|James Marshall
|align="right"|2,488 		 	
|align="right"|18.68%
|align="right"|
|align="right"|unknown

|Liberal
|Arthur Parsons Dawe
|align="right"|642 	
|align="right"|4.82%
|align="right"|
|align="right"|unknown
|- bgcolor="white"
!align="right" colspan=3|Total valid votes
!align="right"|13,322
!align="right"|100.00%
!align="right"|
|- bgcolor="white"
!align="right" colspan=3|Total rejected ballots
!align="right"|115
!align="right"|
!align="right"|
|- bgcolor="white"
!align="right" colspan=3|Turnout
!align="right"|%
!align="right"|
!align="right"|
|}	  	  	  
  	  	  	  	 

|-

|Liberal
|Leo Joseph Matte
|align="right"|1,274 	 	 	
|align="right"|10.65%
|align="right"|
|align="right"|unknown
|- bgcolor="white"
!align="right" colspan=3|Total valid votes
!align="right"|11,957 	
!align="right"|100.00%
!align="right"|
|- bgcolor="white"
!align="right" colspan=3|Total rejected ballots
!align="right"|135
!align="right"|
!align="right"|
|- bgcolor="white"
!align="right" colspan=3|Turnout
!align="right"|%
!align="right"|
!align="right"|
|}  	  	  	 
  	  	  	  	  	  	   	  	 

|-

|Liberal
|Robert Dickson Knox
|align="right"|1,957 		 	
|align="right"|10.81%
|align="right"|
|align="right"|unknown
|- bgcolor="white"
!align="right" colspan=3|Total valid votes
!align="right"|18,109  	
!align="right"|100.00%
!align="right"|
|- bgcolor="white"
!align="right" colspan=3|Total rejected ballots
!align="right"|205
!align="right"|
!align="right"|
|- bgcolor="white"
!align="right" colspan=3|Turnout
!align="right"|%
!align="right"|
!align="right"|
|}  	

|-

|Liberal
|Roger MacPhail Tait
|align="right"|3,917 	 	 	
|align="right"|16.13%
|align="right"|
|align="right"|unknown

|Progressive Conservative
|James Crosland Doak
|align="right"|2,188 	 		 	
|align="right"|9.01%
|align="right"|
|align="right"|unknown
|- bgcolor="white"
!align="right" colspan=3|Total valid votes
!align="right"|24,287 	
!align="right"|100.00%
!align="right"|
|- bgcolor="white"
!align="right" colspan=3|Total rejected ballots
!align="right"|304
!align="right"|
!align="right"|
|- bgcolor="white"
!align="right" colspan=3|Turnout
!align="right"|%
!align="right"|
!align="right"|
|}  		

|-

|Progressive Conservative
|Derril Thomas Warren
|align="right"|6,023	 	 	 	 		 	
|align="right"|24.44%
|align="right"|
|align="right"|unknown

|Liberal
|John Dyck
|align="right"|2,434 	 	 	 	
|align="right"|9.88%
|align="right"|
|align="right"|unknown

}
|Independent
|Kenneth Leslie Craig Hasanen
|align="right"|26 	 	 	 	
|align="right"|.11%
|align="right"|
|align="right"|unknown
|- bgcolor="white"
!align="right" colspan=3|Total valid votes
!align="right"|26,642 	
!align="right"|100.00%
!align="right"|
|- bgcolor="white"
!align="right" colspan=3|Total rejected ballots
!align="right"|113
!align="right"|
!align="right"|
|- bgcolor="white"
!align="right" colspan=3|Turnout
!align="right"|%
!align="right"|
!align="right"|
|- bgcolor="white"
|align="left" colspan=7|Reason for by-election: Resignation of W.A.C. Bennett on June 5, 1973, upon retirement from politics.
|}  	

 	  	  	  	 

|-

|Liberal
|Tom Finkelstein
|align="right"|2,072 	 	 	 	
|align="right"|6.37%
|align="right"|
|align="right"|unknown

|Progressive Conservative
|Alex William Crouch
|align="right"|1,712 	 	 	 	 		 	
|align="right"|5.26%
|align="right"|
|align="right"|unknown
|- bgcolor="white"
!align="right" colspan=3|Total valid votes
!align="right"|32,553 	
!align="right"|100.00%
!align="right"|
|- bgcolor="white"
!align="right" colspan=3|Total rejected ballots
!align="right"|209
!align="right"|
!align="right"|
|- bgcolor="white"
!align="right" colspan=3|Turnout
!align="right"|%
!align="right"|
!align="right"|
|- bgcolor="white"
!align="right" colspan=7|5  27th Premier of British Columbia.
|}

Redistribution of the riding following the 1975 election saw adjustments of its boundaries and a new name, Okanagan South, for the 1979 election.

External links

Sources

Elections BC website - historical election data

Former provincial electoral districts of British Columbia